The Roman Catholic Diocese of Sicuani is a Roman Catholic diocese located in the city of Sicuani in the Ecclesiastical province of Cusco in Peru.

History
On 10 January 1959, the Territorial Prelature of Sicuani was established from the Metropolitan Archdiocese of Cusco.  It was elevated to the status of diocese on September 29, 2020.

Ordinaries
 Prelates of Sicuani (Latin Church)
Nevin William Hayes, O. Carm. (January 10, 1959 – November 7, 1970)
Alban Quinn, O. Carm. (July 12, 1971 – July 1999), Apostolic Administrator, and not consecrated bishop
Miguel La Fay Bardi, O. Carm. (July 26, 1999 – July 10, 2013)
Pedro Alberto Bustamante López (10 July 10, 2013 – 29 September 2020 see below)
 Bishops of Sicuani (Latin Church)
Pedro Alberto Bustamante López (''see above 29 September 2020 – )

References

External links
 GCatholic.org
 Catholic Hierarchy

Roman Catholic dioceses in Peru
Roman Catholic Ecclesiastical Province of Cuzco
Christian organizations established in 1959
Roman Catholic dioceses and prelatures established in the 20th century
Territorial prelatures